Tirupattur Sathyanarayanan Suresh (born 1 July 1986) is an Indian film editor working in the Indian film Industry.

Career 

T.S.Suresh was a graduate in Visual communication from University of Madras. He learned the art of film editing from ace film editor Anthony in several language films between 2005 and 2009.

Having worked on films like Vettaiyaadu Vilaiyaadu, Vaaranam Aayiram and Ghajini as an assistant editor to Mr. Anthony, he went on to make his debut with C. S. Amudhan’s Thamizh Padam.

Filmography

Feature films

Web series

Digital Cinema Designer

Visual Promotions (Teaser and Trailer Promos)

References

External links 
 
 

1986 births
Living people
Malayalam film editors
Tamil film editors
Hindi film editors
Telugu film editors
People from Vellore
Film editors from Tamil Nadu